"How Is Julie?" is a song written by Eddy Carroll (Eddie Carroll) and Barry DeVorzon.

Background
The song's lyrics describe the singer's anguish as Julie, whom he loved, has left him.

Chart performance
In 1962, The Lettermen released it as a single from their album Once Upon a Time. The song continued their streak of top forty hits on Billboard's easy listening chart and just missed the top forty of the Billboard Hot 100.

References

The Lettermen songs
1962 singles
Songs written by Barry De Vorzon
1962 songs
Capitol Records singles